The black-spotted dwarf gecko (Lygodactylus nigropunctatus) is a species of gecko endemic to the northern South Africa (Gauteng, Limpopo, Mpumalanga, and North-West Provinces).

References

Lygodactylus
Reptiles described in 1992
Endemic reptiles of South Africa